Arthur Blake (Arthur Charles "Skipper" Blake; January 26, 1872 – October 23, 1944) was an American athlete who competed in the 1500 meters and the marathon at the 1896 Summer Olympics in Athens.

Biography
Blake was born on January 26, 1872, in Boston, Massachusetts.

Blake competed for the Boston Athletic Association and it was after a 1000 yard race he said in jest "I'm too good for Boston, I ought to go over and run the Marathon, at Athens, in the Olympic Games", the comment was overheard by stockbroker Arthur Burnham, who then offered to finance a US team over to Greece.

At the 1896 Olympics, the 1500 meters was run in a single heat, and Blake came in second to Edwin Flack of Australia.  The race was a tight one, as Flack and Blake overtook the then-leader, Albin Lermusiaux, in the final straight and ran side-by-side nearly all the way to the finish. Flack proved the quicker, however, and finished in 4:33.2. This was less than a second faster than Blake's time of 4:33.6.

He also ran in the final event of the Games, the marathon. Blake, the only American entrant in the race, was in third place to Lermusiaux and Flack throughout the first half of the race. After 23 kilometres, however, Blake was unable to continue and quit the race.

After he stopped competing in athletics he became an insurance salesman and settled down in Dedham, Massachusetts, he was also a keen golfer and sailor.

In the 1984 NBC miniseries, The First Olympics: Athens 1896 he was portrayed by Alex Hyde-White.

He graduated from Harvard University.

Blake died on October 23, 1944, in Boston, Massachusetts.

References

External links

Athletes (track and field) at the 1896 Summer Olympics
19th-century sportsmen
American male middle-distance runners
American male marathon runners
1872 births
1944 deaths
Olympic silver medalists for the United States in track and field
People from Haines City, Florida
Medalists at the 1896 Summer Olympics
Harvard Crimson men's track and field athletes
Sportspeople from Dedham, Massachusetts
Track and field athletes from Boston